Sevkar is a village in the Ijevan Municipality of the Tavush Province of Armenia. Sevkar is the birthplace of the Armenian revolutionary leader Sevkaretsi Sako.

Gallery

References

External links 

Populated places in Tavush Province